Heinrich Spuhler (19 December 1925 – 2 July 1996) was a Swiss racing cyclist. He rode in the 1952 Tour de France.

References

1925 births
1996 deaths
Swiss male cyclists
Place of birth missing